One male athlete from Romania competed at the 1996 Summer Paralympics in Atlanta, United States.

See also
Romania at the Paralympics
Romania at the 1996 Summer Olympics

References 

Nations at the 1996 Summer Paralympics
1996
Summer Paralympics